Bhiria City (Tehsil) is an administrative subdivision of Naushahro Feroze District in the province of Sindh, Pakistan. The tehsil is subdivided into Union Councils and is headquartered at the city of Bhiria City.

Bhiria 
Bhiria is administratively further divided into following:
 Bhiria
 Bhiria Road
 Lakha Road
 Padidan

Naushahro Feroze District
Talukas of Sindh